Nick Bruce (born May 16, 1992) is an American Freestyle BMX cyclist.

From Youngstown, Ohio, Bruce is best known for landing the first flair tailwhip to tailwhip back (flair windshield wiper) and for landing the first 360 double tailwhip to downside tailwhip. A graduate of Hubbard High School in 2011, Bruce was studying business at Youngstown State University, but paused his studies to pursue a BMX career. In July 2021, Bruce qualified to compete in the BMX freestyle event at the 2020 Summer Olympics, one of the 9 competitors, representing 8 nations, to qualify; Bruce finished in 9th in the Olympic final.

References

1992 births
Living people
BMX riders
American male cyclists
Sportspeople from Youngstown, Ohio
Cyclists at the 2020 Summer Olympics
Olympic cyclists of the United States
21st-century American people